Rene Ahrens  from Queensland is an Australian Paralympic athlete and wheelchair basketballer. At the 1980 Arnhem Paralympics, he won a bronze medal in the Men's Discus 5 event and participated in the Australia men's national wheelchair basketball team. Eight years later, he won a  bronze medal at the 1988 Seoul Paralympics in the Men's Discus 6 event.

References

External links
 Rene Ahrens at Australian Athletics Historical Results
 

Paralympic athletes of Australia
Paralympic wheelchair basketball players of Australia
Athletes (track and field) at the 1980 Summer Paralympics
Wheelchair basketball players at the 1980 Summer Paralympics
Athletes (track and field) at the 1988 Summer Paralympics
Paralympic bronze medalists for Australia
Year of birth missing (living people)
Living people
Medalists at the 1980 Summer Paralympics
Medalists at the 1988 Summer Paralympics
Paralympic medalists in athletics (track and field)
Australian male discus throwers
Paralympic discus throwers
Wheelchair discus throwers